In handwriting analysis (graphonomics) a Movement parameter includes Slant, Orientation, Amplitude, Roundness (handwriting).

In kinesiology a Movement parameter is an adjustable scalar quantity to be specified in a motor system, i.e. movement-control system (See: kinesiology, graphonomics). Examples are: Velocity, Acceleration, Force, Stiffness.

Penmanship
Motor control